"King of Hell" is a Korean manhwa that is written by Ra In-Soo and illustrated by Kim Jae-Hwan. The story follows the main character, going by the name of Majeh, who is an envoy to the next world for the King of Hell. When evil spirits started escaping into the living world, the King of Hell had Majeh's spirit returned to his body and ordered Majeh to hunt down and capture these escape demons. As the series progresses, Majeh gets acquainted  with new and old characters in which some of them joins Majeh on his quest into capturing these escape demons.

In Korea, the manhwa is published by Daewon C.I. The chapters of the "King of Hell" Manhwa have been published in Daewon biweekly magazine called Comic Champ. The first volume of King of Hell was released in Korea on March 1, 2002. In the United States the Manhwa was published by Tokyopop with them releasing the first volume  on June 10, 2003. Tokyopop decided not to use the original Korean title, "Majeh" (마제) but instead used the title "King of Hell" for the manhwa. Before Tokyopop shut down their North American publishing facility they've managed to published up to 22 volumes of the series. In the future it's uncertain that the series will be acquired by another English publisher. Daewon currently has published 47 volumes of the series with it still ongoing in Korea.

Volume List

Chapters not yet in tankōbon format

These chapters have yet to be published in a tankōbon volume. They were originally serialized in biweekly issues of Comic Champ from July 2013 to December 2013.

 367. "Published in Volume 15: August 1, 2013 issue of Comic Champ magazine"
 368. "Published in Volume 16: August 15, 2013 issue of Comic Champ magazine"
 369. "Published in Volume 17: September 1, 2013 issue of Comic Champ magazine"
 370. "Published in Volume 18: September 15, 2013 issue of Comic Champ magazine"
 371. "Published in Volume 19: October 1, 2013 issue of Comic Champ magazine"
 372. "Published in Volume 20: October 15, 2013 issue of Comic Champ magazine"
 373. "Published in Volume 21: November 1, 2013 issue of Comic Champ magazine"
 374. "Published in Volume 22: November 15, 2013 issue of Comic Champ magazine"
 375. "Published in Volume 23: December 1, 2013 issue of Comic Champ magazine"
 376. "Published in Volume 24: December 15, 2013 issue of Comic Champ magazine"
 377. "Published in Volume 1: January 1, 2014 issue of Comic Champ magazine"

References

External links
TOKYOPOP's Official Site
Daiwon King of Hell Manhwa Section - (Korean)

Korean culture